This is a list of settlements in Berkshire by population based on the results of the 2011 census. The next United Kingdom census will take place in 2021. In 2011, there were 19 built-up area subdivisions with 5,000 or more inhabitants in Berkshire, shown in the table below.

Population ranking 

** Ward count

Notes

References 

Populated places in Berkshire
Berkshire-related lists
Berkshire